Where Is This Lady? is a 1932 British musical film directed by Victor Hanbury and Ladislao Vajda and starring Mártha Eggerth, Owen Nares and Wendy Barrie. It was made at Elstree Studios. An operetta film, it is a remake of the German film Once There Was a Waltz which was adapted from a stage work by Franz Lehár.

Cast
 Mártha Eggerth as Steffi Piringer  
 Owen Nares as Rudi Muller  
 Wendy Barrie as Lucie Kleiner  
 George K. Arthur as Gustl Linzer  
 Gibb McLaughlin as Dr. Schilling  
 Ellis Jeffreys as Frau Kleiner  
 Robert Hale as Herr Piringer  
 O. B. Clarence as Dr. Peffer

References

Bibliography
 Low, Rachael. Filmmaking in 1930s Britain. George Allen & Unwin, 1985.
 Wood, Linda. British Films, 1927-1939. British Film Institute, 1986.

External links

1932 films
British musical films
1932 musical films
1930s English-language films
Films directed by Ladislao Vajda
Films directed by Victor Hanbury
Films shot at British International Pictures Studios
Operetta films
British multilingual films
British black-and-white films
1932 multilingual films
1930s British films